Le Hamel is a commune in the Somme department and Hauts-de-France region of northern France.

Geography
Le Hamel is situated some 20 km east of Amiens in the valley of the Somme. The surrounding district is the historical Santerre, a lightly wooded and agricultural plateau.

History
The settlement is first documented in 1184 as belonging to the powerful abbey of Corbie. The name has the same root as hameau ("hamlet"), a small rural settlement.

The town and surrounding countryside was the scene of the Battle of Hamel on 4 July 1918, during World War I. The battle, despite being small in scale, is notable for being the first instance in which combined arms tactics were used in warfare.

Places of interest
 A park commemorating the 1000+ Australian troops who died in the Battle of Hamel was inaugurated on 4 July 1998, exactly 80 years after the date of the event. The site symbolises the friendship between France and Australia.
 The lakes of the Somme valley.

Population

See also
Communes of the Somme department
Battle of Le Hamel

References

External links

 Le Hamel
 Santerre 14-18 : World War I in the Santerre

World War I sites in France
Communes of Somme (department)